Robert George Porter  was an Australian Anglican bishop in the 20th century.

Porter was educated at St John's College, Morpeth, and Moore Theological College in Sydney. He was ordained deacon in 1947 and priest in 1948. He served in New Guinea until 1957 when he became Archdeacon of Ballarat. In 1970 he became Bishop of The Murray until his retirement in 1989.

References

Archdeacons of Ballarat
Anglican bishops of The Murray
People educated at St John's College, Morpeth
Moore Theological College alumni
20th-century Anglican bishops in Australia
Officers of the Order of the British Empire